Aalupi is a lake in southeastern Estonia. It is located on the territory of Rebaste village, Kanepi Parish, Põlva County.

See also
List of lakes of Estonia

Aalupi
Kanepi Parish
Aalupi